Colin Campbell (17 January 1937 – 1 March 2018) was an English actor.

Life
His best-known role was the lead in The Leather Boys in 1964, in which he plays a bored married man who starts hanging out with a biker friend—who, he belatedly realises, is gay. Campbell  started off as a child actor, and played John in the 1950s BBC radio Children's Hour adaptation of Worzel Gummidge, and the title role in BBC TV's Huckleberry Finn in 1952. His stage work included appearances at the Old Vic and with the RSC. He also starred in Nuns on the Run (1990) and made many appearances on British television, including in the role of David Ashton, one of the main characters in the popular ITV drama series A Family At War which aired from 1970 to 1972.  Campbell's photograph appears on the cover of the German release of The Smiths' single "Ask" and, as his Leather Boys character, on the cover of The Smiths' single "William, It Was Really Nothing" (only CD version) and with co-star Rita Tushingham in the promotional video for "Girlfriend In A Coma".

He died on 1 March 2018, at the age of 81. Campbell's granddaughter is 1990s pop singer Shola Ama.

Filmography

References

External links
 

1937 births
2018 deaths
English male stage actors
English male film actors
English male television actors
Actors from Twickenham